The République française was a first-rate 118-gun ship of the line of the French Navy, of the Océan type, designed by Jacques-Noël Sané and built by Pierre Rolland.

She was begun at Rochefort in 1794 as the Majesteux, but was given the name République française later that same year. She resumed the name Majestueux in February 1803, prior to being completed in August 1803. She took part in Allemand's expedition of 1805. Scrapped in 1839.

Sources and references

Ships of the line of the French Navy
Océan-class ships of the line
1802 ships
Ships built in France